Alberto Ginés López (born October 23, 2002) is a Spanish professional rock climber, specializing in lead climbing and bouldering. He placed second in the 2019 Lead Climbing World Cup and won a silver medal at the 2019 Lead Climbing European Championship. In August 2021, he won gold at the first Olympic sport climbing event at the 2020 Summer Olympics in Tokyo.

Biography 
Ginés started climbing with his parents when he was very young. In 2013, Ginés, who was 10 years old at the time, met professional climbing coach David Macià in Rodellar, after his father introduced the child to him. Macià was surprised by the attitude with which Ginés climbed El Delfín (7c+), and became his coach. In 2016, after the announcement that climbing would become an Olympic sport at 2020 Summer Olympics in Tokyo, he moved from Cáceres to Barcelona to train, with the goal of qualifying for the international event.

In August 2017, Ginés took a silver medal at the Lead Climbing Youth World Championships, in the category Youth B. A month later, he won the Lead Climbing European Youth Championship in the same category. In May 2018, Ginés won the Lead Climbing European Youth Championship, in the category Youth A. In August 2019, he took bronze medals at the Lead Climbing and Combined Climbing Youth World Championships, in the category Youth A. A month later, Ginés also won a bronze at the Lead Climbing European Youth Championships, in the same category.

On 6 October 2019, Ginés won a silver medal at the Lead Climbing European Championships. Later that month, he finished second in the Lead Climbing World Cup, winning medals in two of its six events: a bronze in Kranj and a silver in the last event, held in Inzai. In November, Ginés qualified to compete at the 2020 Summer Olympics in Tokyo. He won gold in the men's combined event at the 2020 Summer Olympics.

Rankings

Climbing World Cup

Climbing European Championships

Number of medals in the Climbing European Youth Cup

Lead

Bouldering

Number of medals in the Climbing World Cup

Lead

See also
History of rock climbing

References

2002 births
Living people
Spanish rock climbers
Sportspeople from the Province of Cáceres
Sport climbers at the 2020 Summer Olympics
Medalists at the 2020 Summer Olympics
Olympic gold medalists for Spain
Olympic medalists in sport climbing
Olympic sport climbers of Spain
People from Cáceres, Spain
21st-century Spanish people
IFSC Climbing World Cup overall medalists